Baryton. Gracias a la vida is an album of French singer Florent Pagny released in October 2012.
This album makes a series with Baryton, released 8 years before, in 2004.
All the songs are cover songs of famous Latin music songs (tangos, boleros, ...)

Track listing
 El Día Que Me Quieras 04:05; writer: Alfredo Le Pera; composer: Carlos Gardel (1935).
 La Soledad 03:35. Pink Martini's song  (composer: Thomas M. Lauderdale; introduction: Chopin's prelude)
 Gracias a la Vida 03:47; nueva cancion; writer/composer: Violeta Parra. interprets: Mercedes Sosa, Joan Baez...
 Quizás 02:55 (Quizas Quizas Quizas); Cuban bolero;  writer/composer: Osvaldo Farrés (1947); interprets: Nat King Cole (in English: Perhaps, Perhaps, Perhaps), Luis Mariano (in French: Qui sait qui sait qui sait), Abdelhakim Garani (in Arab : Chehilet laayami)!
 Alfonsina y el mar 05:03 (zamba); Composer: Ariel Ramírez; Writer: Félix Luna aka "Falucho"; dédicated to Alfonsina Storni; interprets: Mercedes Sosa, Nana Mouskouri, Maurane, ...
 A La Huella A La Huella 02:58 (a.k.a. "La Peregrinacion"); villancico (Christmas song); composer: Ariel Ramírez; writer: Félix Luna
 Piensa en Mi 04:09; Mexican bolero (1937); Composer: Agustín Lara; interprets : Luz Casal, ...
 Un vestido y un amor 04:21: writer/composer: Rodolfo "Fito" Páez. interprets : Mercedes Sosa
 Volver 04:10; tango; Writer: Alfredo Le Pera; interprets : Carlos Gardel, ....
 Clandestino 03:38; Manu Chao. interprets : Adriana Calcanhotto.
 Los Años 03:09; interprets : Rocío Dúrcal

Charts

Weekly charts

Year-end charts

References

Florent Pagny albums
Covers albums
2012 albums